The Sphenophorini are an important tribe of weevils in the subfamily Dryophthorinae; however, BioLib places this taxon at the subtribe level.

Genera 
Abacobius Lacordaire, 1866
Acantharhinus Schönherr, 1838
Acherus Roelofs, 1891
Adapanetus Guenther, 1936
Aeetes Alonso-Zarazaga & Lyal, 1999
Alloscolytroproctus Hustache, 1929
Anapygus Kirsch, 1875 circa
Anathymus Pascoe, 1885
Anoxyopisthen Kolbe, 1889
Aphanomastix Heller, 1904
Aplotes Chevrolat, 1885
Aporophemus Guenther, 1941
Atarphaeus Guenther, 1937 circa
Barystethus Lacordaire, 1866 
Belopoeus Schönherr, 1838 
Belorhynus Guérin-Méneville, 1833
Billbergia Blackwelder, 1947
Cactophagoides Champion, 1910

Cactophagus LeConte, 1876 
Cercidocerus Guérin-Méneville, 1833
Conopisthen Faust, 1895
Coptopisthen Kolbe, 1899
Coraliphorus Chevrolat, 1883
Cosmopolites Chevrolat, 1885
Cryptocordylus Faust, 1895 
Cyrtomasius Vanin, 1998
Diathetes Pascoe, 1874
Disodontogenus Marshall, 1909
Dolichopisthen Kolbe, 1899 
Foveolus Vaurie, 1968 
Gnamptorrhinus Marshall, 1949
Haplorhynchus Aurivillius, 1886
Heterotoxus Lacordaire, 1866
Ichthyopisthen Roelofs, 1892
Iphthimorhinus Roelofs, 1892
Korotyaevius Alonso-Zarazaga & Lyal, 1999
Liocalandra Chevrolat, 1881
Megastethus Faust, 1899
Meroplus Chevrolat, 1885
Metamasius Horn, 1876
Metaprodioctes Guenther, 1937
Nassophasis C.O. Waterhouse, 1879 
Neos Marshall, 1943 
Odoiporus Chevrolat, 1885
Oresiorrhinus Voss, 1975
Oryctorhinus Scudder, 1893
Paradiaphorus Chevrolat, 1885 
Paramasius Kuschel, 1958
Paraprodioctes Voss, 1958 
Perissoderes CO Waterhouse, 1879
Phacecorynes Schönherr, 1845 
Platyopisthen Roelofs, 1892
Pleurothorax Chevrolat, 1883 
Poteriophorus Schönherr, 1838
Procosmopolites Hustache, 1922
Prodioctes Pascoe, 1874
Pseudacanthorrhinus Heller, 1924 
Rhabdoscelus Marshall, 1943 
Rhinocles Dohrn, 1875
Rhinogrypus Roelofs, 1893
Rhodobaenus LeConte, 1876
Schlaginhaufenia Heller, 1910
Sciabregma Scudder, 1893
Scoliopisthen Hartmann, 1900
Scyphophorus Schönherr, 1838
Sipalomimus Voss, 1958
Sparganobasis Marshall, 1915
Sphenocorynes Schönherr, 1838
Sphenophorus Schönherr, 1826
Stenophida Pascoe, 1866
Tapinostethus Faust, 1894
Temnoschoita Chevrolat, 1885
Tetratopos Chevrolat, 1883
Trigonotarsus Guérin-Méneville, 1833
Trochorhopalus Kirsch, 1877 
Trymatoderus Fairmaire, 1889
Tyndides Pascoe, 1874
Zetheus Pascoe, 1874

References

External links

Curculionidae
Polyphaga tribes